Niall Arthur (born 1992) is an Irish hurler who plays as a full-forward for the Louth senior team.

Arthur made his debut on the inter-county scene when he was selected for the Clare minor team in 2010. He enjoyed one season with the minor team, culminating with the winning of a Munster medal. He subsequently joined the under-21 team, winning back-to-back All-Ireland medals in 2012 and 2013. Arthur later transferred to the Louth senior team, making his debut during the 2018 league.

Career statistics

Honours

Clare
All-Ireland Under-21 Hurling Championship (2): 2012, 2013
Munster Under-21 Hurling Championship (2): 2012, 2013
Munster Minor Hurling Championship (1): 2010

References

1992 births
Living people
Inagh-Kilnamona hurlers
Louth inter-county hurlers